This is a list of writers who have worked for the American magazine Sports Illustrated.

Current
 Pat Forde (since 2019)
 Steve Rushin (since 2010)
 Jon Wertheim (since 1996)
 Jack McCallum (since 1981)

Former

 Walter Bingham (1955–1989)
 Roy Blount Jr. (1968–1975)
 Robert H. Boyle (1954–1995)
 Peter Carry (1970-1975)
 Robert Creamer (1954–1974)
 Frank Deford (1962–1989)
 George Dohrmann (2000–2014)
 David Epstein (2006–2009)
 Michael Farber (1994–2012)
 Ron Fimrite (1971–2002)
 Peter Gammons (1976–78, 1986–96)
 Dick Gordon (1950–1968)
 Karl Taro Greenfeld (2005–2007)
 Jon Heyman (2006–2011)
 Ed Hinton (1995–2000)
 Richard Hoffer (1989–2009)
 Dan Jenkins (1962–1984)
 Sally Jenkins (born 1960)
 Charles Goren (Bridge)1950's
 Jerry Green (1060's-1980's)
 Robert F. Jones (1968–1979)
 Armen Keteyian (1982–1989)
 Jerry Kirshenbaum
 Mark Kram (1963–1977)
 Franz Lidz (1980–2007)
 Jill Lieber (1981–1995)
 Jackie MacMullan (1995–2000)
 Ivan Maisel (1997–2002)
 Stewart Mandel (1999–2014)
 Arash Markazi (2005–2009)
 Tex Maule (1956–1975)
 Jack McCallum (1981–2009)
 Leo Monahan
 Leigh Montville (1989–1998)
 Kenny Moore (1972–1997)
 Jim Murray (1953–1961)
 William Nack (1979–2002)
 Jack Olsen (1960–1971)
 Dan Patrick (2008–2010)
 Jeff Pearlman (1996–2003)
 George Plimpton
 Joe Posnanski (2009–2011) 
 Rick Reilly (1985–2007)
 Selena Roberts (2007–2012)
 Budd Schulberg
 Bud Shrake (1964–1979)
 Michael Silver (1994–2007)
 Gary Smith (1982–2013)
 Shelley Smith (1989–1997)
 E. M. Swift (1978–2010)
 Rick Telander (1983–1995)
 Whitney Tower (1956–1975)
 Kurt Vonnegut (1955)
 Grant Wahl (1996–2019)
 Ralph Wiley (1982–1991)
 Herbert Warren Wind (1954–1960)
 Alexander Wolff (1980–2017)
 Steve Wulf (1978–1991)
 Don Yaeger (1996–2007)
 Paul Zimmerman (1979–2008)

See also

 List of American print journalists
 National Sports Media Association

References

Sports Illustrated
 
Sports Illustrated writers
Sports Illustrated writers